The Flowers Festival is a festival that takes place in Medellín, Colombia. The festival is the most important social event for the city and includes  a pageant, automobiles, a Paso Fino horse parade and many musical concerts.

History

The first Flowers Festival took place on May 1, 1957. It was organized by Arturo Uribe, a member of the Board of the Office of Development and Tourism in Medellin, Colombia. The festival lasted for five days with an exposition of flowers displayed in the Metropolitan Cathedral, which was organized by the Gardening Club of Medellín and monsignor Tulio Botero to celebrate the Virgin Mary day. This flower parade represents the end of slavery when slaves carried men and women on their backs up steep hills instead of flowers. The first silleteros parade also took place with some 40 men from the corregimiento of Santa Elena carrying on their backs flower arrangements to the exposition site.

This festival initially took place during the month of May but was changed to August in 1958 to celebrate the independence of Antioquia. Since then, other events have been added like the International Pageant of the Flowers, the cavalcade, Guinness Records in 1996 and 1999, classic automobiles parade, Orchids exposition, among others.

2006 edition
In 1999 during its first edition, the festival reached 482 silleteros participants. The 2006 edition also featured a new category of silleteros as spokeswomen for the Convention Center Bureau of Madrid Maria Isabel Lopez mentioned "these are the Pioneers, who will show all their Silletas making experience, but will not participate in the contest". Some 50 peasants will carry the silletas, 260 featuring traditional arrangements, 50 with commercial propaganda and 28 from the new Pioneer category. As in previous years, the Mayor of Medellín sponsored the awards of the Silleteros contest. In 2006, there were a total of 260 awards, selected and given by three juries.

References

External links

  The Flowers Festival official website 
  The Flowers Festival Twitter
  Flower Festivals in Spain
  The Flowers Festivals in Medellin

 

Garden festivals in Colombia
Flower festivals in Colombia